Dumitru Celeadnic (born 23 April 1992) is a Moldovan footballer who plays as a goalkeeper for FC Sheriff Tiraspol.

International career
He made his international debut in February 2019, when his own-goal ensured Moldova lost 1–0 to Kazakhstan.

External links

Profile at FC Dacia Chișinău
 Profile at FC Sheriff Tiraspol

1992 births
Moldovan footballers
Moldova international footballers
Association football goalkeepers
Living people
FC Speranța Crihana Veche players
FC Dacia Chișinău players
FC Dinamo-Auto Tiraspol players
CS Petrocub Hîncești players
FC Sheriff Tiraspol players
Moldovan Super Liga players